The Kōbusho 講武所 (a.k.a. Rikugunsho) was a Japanese military academy. It was set up in the final decades of the Edo period in response to Japan's experience of Western military power, and taught Western battlefield tactics such as artillery use alongside traditional Japanese martial arts. The academy was located in Misakichō, Tokyo. It closed in 1866, after only ten years in operation.

References

Educational organizations based in Japan
Defunct Japanese military academies